The Palau National Stadium (PCC Track & Field Stadium) is a multi-purpose sports stadium in Koror City, Palau.  It is used primarily for track and field events as well as many football matches. The stadium has a capacity of 4,000.

Football
The stadium is used by the Palau Soccer Association as a venue for the competitive football matches that it oversees, as well as being the home stadium for the Palau national football team.

The national stadium is used by the following teams and leagues:
Palau national football team (as Home stadium)
Palau Soccer League (for all games, due to lack of suitable venues in Palau).
Belau Games - for all football matches.

References

External links
 Soccerway: PCC Track & Field
 Stadionwelt: National Stadium
 World Stadiums: Palau National Stadium

Football venues in Palau
Athletics (track and field) venues in Palau
Palau
Multi-purpose stadiums
Buildings and structures in Koror